Utah Festival Opera & Musical Theatre (UFOMT) is an opera company based in Logan, Utah.  The company performs four fully staged works with orchestra in repertory every July and August at the Ellen Eccles Theatre on Logan's Main Street.  The works performed range from operas to operettas to musicals.  Singers, performers, technicians and orchestra come from all over the United States, including artists from Broadway and the Metropolitan Opera.

Founding 
The company was founded in 1992 by operatic tenor Michael Ballam, a music professor at Utah State University, and a native of Logan.  Besides being director of the company, he has also sung lead roles in many productions over the years.

Naughty Marietta by Victor Herbert was the first work performed by the company in 1993, along with Puccini's La Bohème and a double bill of Trial By Jury and The Impresario.  Up through the 2000 season, there were three works in repertory.  This increased to four in 2001, with productions of The Barber of Seville, South Pacific, Naughty Marietta and Susannah.  In addition to the main stage productions, Utah Festival Opera & Musical Theatre offers many concerts and educational courses to supply their patrons with the greatest festival experience possible, including performances from The American Festival Chorus, conducted by Craig Jessop.

The Dansante 

The offices, scene and costume shops of the company are located adjacent to the Ellen Eccles Theatre in the Dansante building, a former dance hall.  The Dansante also has a Recital Hall that seats 125, as well as large rehearsal rooms and practice rooms.

The Utah Theatre 

In 2007 UFOMT purchased the 350 seat Utah Theatre, and took on a major gut-renovation of that facility, which was completed in June 2016.  This addition to the company will allow an addition of 2-3 smaller works to be performed, as well as showings of classic and silent films, accompanied by the Mighty Wurlitzer Organ.  The premiere performance at the Utah Theatre was Moose Charlap and Jule Styne's Peter Pan, starring Michael Ballam as Captain Hook and Adam T. Biner as Peter Pan.

Opera by Children 
Opera by Children is an educational outreach program which has provided training for teachers and in-class mentoring for over 75,000 children to create their own operas in a classroom setting.  Teachers throughout Utah and many western states are using this unique tool to increase unity, self-discovery and enthusiasm for learning in their classrooms.  There is no cost to Utah teachers as their expenses are covered by generous state grants save a small fee for materials and their attendance at an Opera by Children training workshop, after which they are then eligible for participation in the full year-long program.  The program is run by Pamela Gee.

Conservatory 
UFOMT also has a Youth Conservatory where kids, ranging from 8–18 years old, learn about all aspects of performing in musical theatre.  Classes include acting, dance and singing which are taught by musical theatre professionals.  During the Festival Season, the Conservatory hosts a week-long musical theatre intensive camp called Broadway Bound.  Here the students work with company members on fine-tuning their musical skills and at the end of the week they put on a showcase of the material they have been working on throughout the week.  In 2014, the program became so popular that they had to split the camp into Junior and Seniors so more children could participate.  The Conservatory director is Stefan Espinosa.

Academy 
During each Festival Season, UFOMT offers adult education courses relating to the productions that are being performed.  The program is run by Vanessa Ballam.  Michael Ballam offers a week-long Opera and Musical Theatre seminar where he dissects each show, looking at its history, as well as other works by that particular composer.  Highlights of the Academy include the Presto Change-O(ver) class where patrons come after a matinee performance and see the technical crew change the sets from one show to another in less than an hour; managing director Gary Griffin's cooking classes; the Late Night Cabarets where Festival artists perform under the stars in an outdoor, intimate setting; the Artist's Pallet class that brings in local artist, Kent Wallis to paint a landscape in two hours time.

The Academy also offers Literary Seminars each Wednesday-Friday morning of the season, where directors, performers and designers come in to talk about their experiences that lead them to UFOMT as well as their processes in creating their roles in the productions.

Past instructors include Michael Ballam, Vanessa Ballam, Stefan Espinosa, Phillip R. Lowe, Patti Johnson, Kevin Nakatani, Valerie Rachelle, Maggie L. Harrer, Kent Wallis, Larry Winborg, Paula Fowler, Yancey Quick, Craig Jessop, Jared Rounds, Roni Stein, Jack Shouse, Nathan Buonviri, Vanessa Schukis, Kathy Johnson, Kathleen Lane and Sheldon Harnick.

Utah High School Musical Theatre Awards 
Beginning in 2011, UFOMT entered into the National High School Musical Theatre Awards program.  This program is designed to recognize excellence in Musical Theatre in high schools throughout the country.  During the school year, representatives from UFOMT travel across the state to adjudicate high school productions. Nominated schools and artists perform and winners are announced at an awards ceremony, that is Utah's own version of the Tony Awards.  The winners of Best Actress and Best Actor are sent to New York City to participate in the National High School Musical Theatre Awards, or the Jimmy's, founded by James L. Neederlander.  The students make their Broadway debuts at the Minskoff Theatre, current home of The Lion King.

Awards include: Best Musical, Best Actor, Best Actress, Best Supporting Actor, Best Supporting Actress, Best Cameo, Best Director, Best Choreography, Best Ensemble, Best Orchestra, Best Scenic Design, Best Costume Design, Best Lighting Design, Best Technical Crew, and student awards in Choreography, Costume Design, Set Design and Lighting Design.

Past winners 
*indicates Jimmy Awards finalist

Production history 
*indicates UFOMT debut

References

External links
Utah Festival Opera & Musical Theatre

Musical groups established in 1992
American opera companies
Tourist attractions in Cache County, Utah
1992 establishments in Utah
Performing arts in Utah